The House film series consists of American horror installments, with subgenres ranging in variety, including: psychological, supernatural, slasher, comedy, and adventure. The plot of the first installment was based on an original story written by Fred Dekker, with subsequent movies being based on his initial concept. The overall plot of the individual movies center around the supernatural events that take place at haunted houses, and detail the actions of the protagonist families that live in them.

Though the original film was initially met with mixed critical reception, it has since been deemed a cult classic in the horror genre. Due to its financial success at the box office, the studio and its producers fast-tracked a standalone sequel. Written and directed by the first installment's screenwriter, the second film was met with overwhelmingly negative critical reaction and mild box office returns. Despite this, the installment has also gained a cult following in the years since. The third film was both a monetary and critical failure, though a few aspects have received some praise by modern retrospective analysis. With financial losses, the fourth and final movie was produced with a microbudget and given a direct-to-home video release in the U.S., due to the increase popularity of video rental stores, and limited theatrical release in other countries. The film was met with financial disappointment and negative reception from its critics as well as its audience. Despite this, the movie was number one in Italian theaters upon its release, while modern film critics acknowledge its return-to-form for the series.

Film

House (1986)

A formerly popular, troubled author named Roger Cobb is tasked with writing another novel by his publisher. These new stresses associated with his contractual obligations, compound the reality that he and his wife have separated after his young son has gone missing. Cobb finds himself the heir of an old house when his elderly aunt who recently committed suicide in the home, leaves the estate to him. Despite the discouragement of others, he decides to spend his time there while he writes his book. Though the financers want him to write another horror story, he opts to base the tale on his time in the Vietnam War instead. Shortly after moving in, he begins to have horrific nightmares and experiences strange phenomena during the daylight hours. A series of attacks from other-worldly entities convinces the author to confide in those around him, though his neighbor begins to question his sanity.

He soon locates a gateway within the home, which leads to another dimension where he locates his son. After returning with Jimmy, he must also face the ghosts of his past including a personification of his comrade named Big Ben, who was killed during their time in Vietnam. Cobb seeks to work through his problems, while overcoming his inner demons, so that he can reunite with his recently reformed family.

House II: The Second Story (1987)

Jesse McLaughlin, and his girlfriend Kate move into his old family mansion together. Though he inherited the property at as a baby when his parents died, he has purposefully avoided the property. The couple allow his best friend Charlie Coriell, and the latter's girlfriend to move in as additional roommates. Together the group begin sorting through the various rooms in the home. They soon discover some memorabilia in the basement, which once belonged to his great-great-grandfather (and namesake). "Gramps", who was a treasure hunter was the keeper of an Aztec crystal skull that he discovered with his partner and friend-turned-enemy "Slim" Reeser. After examining some photographs and paperwork, they resolve to dig up the grave of his ancestor, believing that he had the ancient treasure buried with him.

In the process of doing so, the curse of the item inadvertently awakens the spirit of the older McLaughlin and reanimates his corpse. Upon realizing that Jesse is his descendant, Jesse "Gramps" McLaughlin proves to be an ally to their cause. When they return to the mansion, "Gramps" is disheartened to see that he is merely a zombie and not rejuvenated to his peak physicality. After the old cowboy tells stories from his past, he explains that the stones of the house are made from remnants of an Aztec temple and that the skull acts as a key to enter different portals across different periods of time in each room. He tasks the friends with defending the artifact against the forces of evil, that are drawn to its power. As they fight across the various time periods which open within the mansion, they form alliances with additional individuals: a young pterodactyl, a caterpillar-dog-like hybrid animal which they name "Cater-Puppy", and an adventurer named Bill Towner who comes to their aid under the guise of an electrician.

Despite these small successes, an undead Reeser rises from his death to steal the crystal skull for its mystic abilities, revealing that he was the murderer of Jesse's parents years ago. The miss-mashed team of friends from different spans of time, must once again join against the forces that seek to overtake them, end the plans "Slim" Reeser to defend all of reality, and send him back to his grave once and for all.

House III: The Horror Show (1989)

Continuing the anthological nature of the franchise, the film was developed as a sequel. Deemed darker and more mature than previous installments, producers decided to market the film without the House name for the U.S. theatrical release. Despite this, the movie was released with the House moniker in foreign markets. After the poor box office reception, which some perceived as partially due to the confusion caused by the title and the general audience not realizing that it was a House film, the installment was re-marketed with its full title and distributed on home entertainment by the associated studios. The premise of the film follows:

Detective Lucas McCarthy who has pursued the serial killer Max "The Cleaver" Jenkins for years, finally makes his arrest. Following his prosecution and sentencing to death, McCarthy is amongst those present at the execution. During the process, Jenkins promises revenge  in his final words, just prior to being electrocuted. After his death, the McCarthy family moves into a new home and try to move on from the horrific events. Despite this, evidence begins to come form, which calls into question McCarthy's association to the victims of the murderer. As an investigation ensues, strange occurrences take place and terrify the family within their home. They all begin to believe that "The Cleaver" is tormenting them from beyond the grave, as he promised in his final moments. A parapsychologist named Peter Campbell that the family hires, proports that the killer must have made a deal with the devil prior to his execution, allowing his spirit to return and haunt the family. Campbell warns that the only way that they will be able to escape the cursed soul of Jenkins, is if they destroy his spirit.

As the inexplicable events increase and become worse, the family seeks to clear McCarthy's good name with the law, all while attempting to save their own lives as the ghost of a mass murderer begins to hunt them.

House IV: The Repossession (1992)

Roger Cobb, who remarried a woman named Kelly and fathered a child with her named Laurel, mourns the passing of his father. Though his estranged step-brother Burke admonishes him to sell the old Cobb family home, he wishes to keep the home for nostalgic memories from his childhood and with the knowledge that he promised his father that he would keep the land in the ownership of the family.

After an unforeseen auto collision ends with his death, Laurel finds herself a widow that must care for their daughter who is now paralyzed and wheelchair-bound. Now the heir to the Cobb house, Burke begins to pressure her into selling the estate. Despite her initial resistance, inexplicable paranormal events begin to take place within their home. Scaring her into consideration of the sale, she seeks the help of a Native American spiritual guide named Ezra. After conversing with the spirits that reside in the house, the old man reveals to Kelly and Laurel that the strange happenings are the attempts of a warning from the ghosts of Roger and a number of Native Americans. The Natives resided on the land prior to that of the Cobb family, and viewed it as sacred-natured. The spirits are warning them of pending danger.

As it's revealed that Burke is in negotiations to sell the land to a powerful Mafian group that will soil the once revered location, with the disposal of toxic waste on the vicinity, evidence suggests that the estranged family member may be responsible for the car wreck that previously took place. Together as a family, and with the help of these paranormal beings, they must overcome the advances of the wicked group that seek to take the land as their own.

Future
In January 2023, it was announced that a new film intended to relaunch the IP is in development. Jeremy Weiss will serve as director, with a script written by Jeff Lockner, from a story pitch co-authored by Lockner and Weiss. The plot is said to be a comedy-horror contemporary reimagining of the series that will include monster characters from the original film. The pair pitched their story to Sean S. Cunningham, who approved the story and will be serving as producer. The first teaser poster debuted, with the release slated for an unspecified date in 2024.

Main cast and characters

Additional crew and production details

Reception

Box office and financial performance

Critical and public response

Notes

References 

Horror film franchises
Film franchises introduced in 1986